Joseph Till (born c. 1895) was an English footballer who played for Dumbarton, St Mirren, Luton Town and Crewe Alexandra.

References

1890s births
Year of birth uncertain
Year of death missing

English footballers
Dumbarton F.C. players
Luton Town F.C. players
Crewe Alexandra F.C. players
Scottish Football League players
English Football League players
St Mirren F.C. players
Association footballers not categorized by position